In BEAM robotics, a Phototrope is a robot that reacts to light sources. Literally, "light turning," this term is generally (if somewhat inaccurately) applied to light-seeking robots. More accurately, phototropes can either seek (photophiles) or flee (photophobes) bright sources of light.

The simplest and most common form of phototrope is the photopopper—many are as simple as to be essentially two solarrollers stuck together.

One mechanism for phototropism in robotics is implementation of a light sensor where a direct feedback system allows for interaction with the environment.  The phototrope analyzes "shots" of its environment and decides whether to move into a certain area depending upon the light intensity.

Alternatively, photovoltaic cells may be used to provide both control and energy for a phototrope.  Clever geometry in construction allows for current yielded by a photovoltaic cell to cause motion in the direction of (or away from) the most intense light source in the robots vicinity.

BEAM robotics